The first season of Cambodian reality singing competition program Cambodian Idol premiered on 12 July 2015 on Hang Meas HDTV. Based on the reality singing competition Pop Idol, the series was created by British television producer Simon Fuller. It is part of an international series.

The Judges Auditions

Episode 1: July 12, 2015

Episode 2: July 19, 2015

Episode 3: July 26, 2015

Episode 4: August 2, 2015

Episode 5: August 9, 2015

Theater Round

Episode 6: August 16, 2015

Episode 7: August 23, 2015

Green Miles

Episode 8: August 30, 2015

Live Show

Episode 9: September 6, 2015

Episode 10: September 13, 2015

Episode 11: September 20, 2015

Episode 12: September 27, 2015

Episode 13: October 4, 2015

Episode 14: October 11, 2015

First round

Second Round: In Pair

Episode 15: October 18, 2015

Episode 16: October 25, 2015

Episode 17: November 1, 2015

Season 1 Finalist Chart

References

External links 
 
 
 

2015 Cambodian television seasons
Idols (franchise)